4 Sagittarii is a suspected astrometric binary star system in the zodiac constellation of Sagittarius, located approximately 390 light years away based on parallax. It is visible to the naked eye as a faint, blue-white hued star with an apparent visual magnitude of 4.74, The system is moving closer to the Earth with a heliocentric radial velocity of −18 km/s.

The visible component is a B-type main-sequence star with a stellar classification of  B9 V. It has a high rate of spin, displaying a projected rotational velocity of 149 km/s. This is giving it an oblate shape with an equatorial bulge that is an estimated 14% larger than the polar radius. 4 Sagittarii has 3.23 times the mass of the Sun and is radiating 240 times the Sun's luminosity from its photosphere at an effective temperature of 9,661 K.

References

B-type main-sequence stars
Astrometric binaries
Sagittarius (constellation)
CD-23 13731
Sagittarii, 04
163955
088116
6700